The 1950–51 Irish Cup was the 71st edition of the premier knock-out cup competition in Northern Irish football. 

The defending champions were Linfield, however they were defeated 3-1 in the semi-finals by Glentoran.

Glentoran won the cup for the 7th time, defeating Ballymena United 3–1 in the final at Windsor Park.

Results

First round

|}

Replay

|}

Second replay

|}

Quarter-finals

|}

Replay

|}

Semi-finals

|}

Final

References

External links
The Rec.Sport.Soccer Statistics Foundation - Northern Ireland - Cup Finals

Irish Cup seasons
1950–51 in Northern Ireland association football
1950–51 domestic association football cups